Launch Complex 13 (LC-13) was a launch complex at Cape Canaveral Space Force Station, the third-most southerly of the original launch complexes known as Missile Row, lying between LC-12 and LC-14. In 2015, the LC-13 site was leased by SpaceX and was renovated for use as Landing Zone 1 and Landing Zone 2, the company's East Coast landing location for returning Falcon 9 and Falcon Heavy launch vehicle booster stages. It is leased by US Space Force to Phantom Space and Vaya Space who will operate this launch complex after the termination of SpaceX's lease in future.

LC-13 was originally used for test launches of the SM-65 Atlas and subsequently for operational Atlas launches from 1958 to 1978. It was the most-used and longest-serving of the original four Atlas pads. It was inactive between 1980 and 2015. 

On 16 April 1984, it was added to the US National Register of Historic Places; however it was not maintained and gradually deteriorated. On 6 August 2005 the mobile service tower was demolished as a safety precaution due to structural damage by corrosion.  The blockhouse was demolished in 2012.

LC-13 was on land owned by the US government and was originally controlled by the United States Air Force.  It was transferred to NASA in 1964 and back to the Air Force in 1970.  In January 2015, the land and remaining facilities at LC-13 were leased to SpaceX for a five-year lease.

Rocket configuration (LC-13)

Rocket configuration (LZ-1)

Rocket configuration (LZ-2)

Launch Complex 13 
Together with Launch Complexes 11, 12 and 14, LC-13 featured a more robust design than many contemporary pads due to the greater power of the Atlas compared to other rockets of the time. The rockets were delivered to the launch pad by a ramp on the south side of the launch pedestal.

1956-1961 Atlas Missile tests 
Starting in 1958, Atlas B, D, E and F missiles were tested from the complex.

One on-pad explosion occurred, the launch of Missile 51D in March 1960, which suffered combustion instability within seconds of launch. The Atlas fell back onto LC-13 in a huge fireball, putting the pad out of commission for the entire spring and summer of 1960.

Prior to the launch of Atlas 51D, the separate turbine exhaust ducts had been removed from the four Atlas pads at CCAS. A few weeks later, another Atlas exploded on LC-11 and it was then decided to reinstall the exhaust ducts, although it was considered unlikely that they had anything to do with the failures.

The next launch hosted from LC-13 was the first Atlas E test on October 11, exactly seven months after the accident with Missile 51D. Afterwards, LC-13 remained the primary East Coast testing site for Atlas E missiles, with Atlas F tests mainly running from LC-11 (Missile 2F in August 1961 was the only F-series Atlas launched from LC-13).

1962–1978 Atlas Agena 
Between February 1962 and October 1963 the pad was converted for use by Atlas-Agena. The modifications were more extensive than the conversions of LC-12 and LC-14 with the mobile service tower being demolished and replaced with a new, larger tower. The first launch from the renovated pad was Vela 1 on October 17, 1963.

Significant launches included:
 Lunar Orbiter 1 on 10 August 1966. It photographed proposed landing sites for Apollo and Surveyor spacecraft on the Moon, and returned the first pictures of the Earth from lunar orbit.
 Several classified payloads for the National Reconnaissance Office, believed to include Canyon and Rhyolite satellites.

The final launch from LC-13 was a Rhyolite satellite on 7 April 1978, using an Atlas-Agena.

The pad was deactivated from 1980 to 2015.

Landing Zones 1 and 2 

The site of the former Launch Complex 13 is now leased to SpaceX, and designated as Landing Zones 1 and 2.

SpaceX signed a five-year lease for the land at the former Launch Complex 13 on 10 February 2015 to use the area to land reusable launch vehicles. The company originally planned to convert the old Atlas launch facility into a set of five discrete landing pads, one large primary pad with four smaller alternate pads surrounding it. However, this plan was changed to only include two pads which have already been built at the landing complex.

SpaceX accomplished its first successful landing at the complex on the Falcon 9 Flight 20 mission, which occurred on 22 December 2015 UTC.

Notes

References

External links

Cape Canaveral AFS Virtual Tour
Launch Complex 13, Air Force Space and Missile Museum , Cape Canaveral, Florida
Proposed vertical landing facility at LC 13, Draft Environmental Impact Statement, October 2014, 45th Space Wing, Patrick Air Force Base.

Cape Canaveral Space Force Station
SpaceX facilities